Novokochkildino (Yañı Küskilde) is a rural locality (a village) in Urmiyazovsky Selsoviet, Askinsky District, Bashkortostan, Russia. The population was 330 as of 2010. There are 4 streets.

Geography 
Novokochkildino is located 22 km east of Askino (the district's administrative centre) by road. Urmiyazy is the nearest rural locality.

References 

Rural localities in Askinsky District